Jani Kristian "Jay" Hölli is a Finnish Musician from Tampere.  He has played keyboards in several Finnish Power and Progressive Metal bands. These have included, Snakegod, Dingo, Soulrelic, Villieläin, Technical Justice and Leewings.  He is the current keyboard player in the Finnish multi genre band, Waltari.

Hölli has been playing piano since the age of 9 and is a classically trained pianist. He received formal tuition for seven years at a school which he attended. He studied songwriting at the prestigious Sibelius Academy for a year in 2010.

He has written and arranged songs for a variety of artists such as DCX, Terhi Matkainen and Abraham Mateo As a songwriter, Hölli has amassed a revenue cut in a total of over 7 million album sales worldwide. He co-wrote the Techno Dance song, Screams with Joel Kalsi  which was performed by Kalsi and Applejack and featured vocals by UK artist Tina Cousins who has had 5 UK top 20 hits.

Hölli is a fan of the Eurovision Song Contest and has entered the competition multiple times as both a songwriter and a performer. In 2010, as a part of the band Villieläin, he entered the initial stages of the Finnish Euroviisut song selection process with the song Ei Minua which means Not Me in English. The song gained a large number of votes during the online voting phase of the competition, however despite this it failed to reach the top ten in the voting and therefore the song did not progress into the live, televised semi finals. Played with glam-rock band Stala & SO. in 2011, as special keyboard player.  His second entry to the Euroviisut in 2012 was more successful. He co-wrote the song Erase You by DCX, which reached position 9 in the semi finals. In 2014 he composed a song with lyricist and songwriter Efrem Macheras called No Money, No Honey which was put forward for selection as a potential entry for Cyprus in the 2015 Eurovision Song Contest. The song was performed by Elena Panagi.

Jani wrote songs for two of the finalists of a popular, televised music talent competition in Finland called Idols. These are Agnes Pihlava and Kalle Löfström

Hölli was involved with the musical scoring and production of a short film about a man's struggle with long term diabetes called Dia-Cide.

He uses Korg Triton and Yamaha DX-9 Keyboards.

Discography

Invitation- Snakegod, 2001
Kipinä- Hannu Savo Ja Kamiina, 2002 
Love is a Lie We Both Believed- Soulrelic, 2005
Julma Satu- Villieläin, 2009
Facebookissa- Dingo, 2012
Adios Rosaria- Dingo, 2012
Oma Waterloo- Neumann, 2013
You are Waltari- Waltari, 2015
Juggernautti- kilpi, 2015
Global Rock- Waltari, 2020

Songwriting Credits

Joku Kuuntelee- Rainio Bros., 2002
Dead king- Kalle Löfström, 2009
Ready to fall- Agnes Pihlava, 2009
Ma Jaan- Eini, 2011
Illallinen- Eini, 2011
Saisit haudatun kuun- Eini, 2011
Turn it over- Pandora, 2011
Won't let you down again- Stala & SO, 2011
Villi Pohjola-Jussi Aaltonen, 2012
Puudasta Ilmaa-Terhi Matikainen, 2012 
Erase You- DCX, 2012
Girlfriend- Abraham Mateo, 2013 (#1 Spain single charts)
Set this place on fire- Frixion, 2013 (#9 UK R 'n' B / soul charts)
Rock until I'm done- Stala & SO, 2013
The boys are having fun- Stala & SO, 2013
Never again- Stala & SO, 2013
Life goes on- Stala & SO, 2013
Mä Tein Oikein- Saija Varjus, 2013
Tähtisade- Mervi Koponen, 2013
Screams- Kalsi and Applejack feat, Tina Cousins, 2014
Lautta- Kilpi, 2014
Elämään Sait Mut Uudelleen- Mari Varjovirta, 2014
Gimmie All Your Love- Zaena Morisho, 2014
No Money, No Honey- Elena Panagi, 2014
Breaking free- Tina Cousins, 2014
Out of my head- Tina Cousins, 2014
Ashes to diamonds- Jessica Wolff, 2014
Headlong- Stala & SO, 2015
Goodbye- Stala & SO, 2015
Sinun verran kevyempi- Yö, 2016
Pikkukaupungin poika- Sampsa Astala, 2017
Poisonouz- Michella Evers, 2019
Setelit lentää- Sampsa Astala, 2019
Huumaa- Sampsa Astala, 2019
Skyline- Waltari, 2020
I Had it all- Waltari, 2020

Studio albums:

Love is the lie we both believed- Soulrelic, 2005
Julma Satu- Villieläin, 2020

References

Living people
Musicians from Tampere
Finnish pianists
Finnish songwriters
Year of birth missing (living people)